Austin Hill Young (December 6, 1830 – February 13, 1905) was an American politician, who served as a member of the Wisconsin State Senate and as a Minnesota District Court judge.

He was born in Fredonia, New York, and moved to Prescott, Wisconsin, in 1854 and then to Minneapolis, Minnesota, in 1866.

Young married twice. First, to Martha Martin in 1854. Second, to Leonore Martin in 1872. They had two children.

He died at his home in Minneapolis on February 13, 1905.

Career
Young was a member of the Senate as a Republican from 1864 to 1865. Previously, he had served as District Attorney of Pierce County, Wisconsin.

In 1871, Young was elected City Attorney of Minneapolis. The following year, he was appointed to be a judge of the Court of Common Pleas. He then went on to be Judge of the Fourth Judicial District from 1877 to 1891.

References

People from Fredonia, New York
People from Prescott, Wisconsin
Politicians from Minneapolis
Republican Party Wisconsin state senators
Wisconsin lawyers
Minnesota lawyers
Minnesota Republicans
1830 births
1905 deaths
Lawyers from Minneapolis
19th-century American politicians